Orthotylus josifovi is a species of bug in the Miridae family that is endemic to Bulgaria.

References

josifovi
Endemic fauna of Bulgaria
Hemiptera of Europe
Insects described in 1959